Abiathar  (’Eḇyāṯār, "the father is great"), also spelled Eviatar or Evyatar in Modern Hebrew, is a a High Priest described in the Bible.

Later notable people with the name include:

Abiathar
 Abiathar ben Elijah ha-Cohen (1040–1109), Palestinian Gaon
 Abiathar Crescas, Spanish-Jewish physician
 Charles Abiathar White (1826–1910), American geologist
 Clarence Abiathar Waldo (1852-1926), American mathematician
 Abiathar, a Jewish priest of Mtskheta in Georgia who converted to Christianity alongside his daughter Sidonia

Eviatar
 Eviatar Banai (born 1973), Israeli musician
 Eviatar Manor (born 1949), Israeli diplomat
 Eviatar Nevo (born 1929), Israeli professor
 Eviatar Zerubavel (born 1948), Israeli professor
 Eviatar Matania (born 1966), founder and Head of the Israel National Cyber Bureau

Evyatar
 Evyatar Baruchyan (born 1989), Israeli footballer
 Evyatar Iluz (born 1983), Israeli footballer

Places
 Abiathar Peak, Wyoming, US